Bian Liunian is a Chinese musician, composer and musical director. He is responsible for the musical production of the Beijing 2008 Olympic Closing Ceremony.

Liunian has specialized in playing the two-string fiddle erhu, a Chinese traditional folk instrument. In addition to the erhu he plays over 200 musical instruments. As a composer he creates more than 200 musical works every year.

2001 saw him duet on Erhu with Dj Mel”Herbie”Kent (UK) scratch mixing on turntables to a capacity 73,000 crowd at the Workers Stadium Beijing for the closing ceremony of the Universiade.

He has been the Musical Director for over 14 years for the CCTV New Year's Gala, one of the most watched television programs in the world.

References

Erhu players
People's Republic of China composers
Music directors
Living people
Year of birth missing (living people)